Sootaguse is a village in Kadrina Parish, Lääne-Viru County in Estonia.

References

Villages in Lääne-Viru County